Leonid Ivanovich Feodorov (4 November 1879 – 7 March 1935) was a Studite hieromonk from the Russian Greek Catholic Church, the first Exarch of the Russian Catholic Apostolic Exarchate of Russia, and a survivor of the Gulag at Solovki prison camp. He was beatified at Lviv by Pope John Paul II on 27 June 2001.

Early life
Feodorov was born in Saint Petersburg, Russia, on 4 November 1879, into a Russian Orthodox family. His father, Ivan Feodorovich Feodorov, was the son of a former State serf from Yaroslavl Governorate and had become the owner of a successful St. Petersburg restaurant whose regular patrons included a young Joseph Stalin. 

His mother, Lyuba Feodorov, a woman of Greek descent, raised him as a single mother after his father's early death. Although she attempted to raise her son as a devout member of the Russian Orthodox Church, she simultaneously encouraged him to read the popular novelists of the day.

He later recalled, "So I began to devour the best known French novelists of the day, Zola, Hugo, Maupassant, and Dumas. I became acquainted with the Italian Renaissance and its corrupt literature, Boccaccio and Ariosto. My head came to be like a sewer into which the foulest muck was emptied."

While attending the Second Imperial Gymnasium in St. Petersburg, Feodorov considered himself to be both a Buddhist and a Nihilist. He often used to quote the maxim, "War is the daughter of God", and intended to become an officer in the Imperial Russian Army. Under the influence of the Gymnasium's Orthodox chaplain and teacher of religion, Fr. Konstantin (Smirnov), Feodorov underwent a religious conversion and instead decided to study for the Orthodox priesthood.

After his graduation from the Gymnasium in 1901, he enrolled in the Saint Petersburg Theological Academy in order to study for the priesthood in the Russian Orthodox Church. During a crisis of Faith, Feodorov came to believe, "through the reading of the Father and of history", that the Roman Catholic Church is the one true church. In response, he began discreetly attending the Tridentine Mass at St. Catherine's Church on Nevsky Prospect. At the Ecclesiastical Academy, his teachers took to calling Feodorov, "our Catholic."

After much soul-searching, Feodorv decided to leave his studies in the summer of 1902 and travel to Rome in order to openly convert to the Roman Catholic Church. In order to interrupt his studies and be granted a passport necessary for foreign travel, Feodorov needed the permission of the Academy Inspector, Archimandrite Theofan (Bystrov), who responded, "I know very well why you wish to go to Italy... So be it, and may God keep you." Fr. Cyril Korolevsky alleges that Archimandrite Theofan, "was quite convinced of the truth of Catholicism, but like a number of others he could not bring himself to take the definite step." In reality, Archimandrite Theofan remained Orthodox even after the October Revolution, when he become a refugee from in Bulgaria and France.

Leonid Feodorov and his Catholic spiritual mentor, Fr. Jan Szyslawski, travelled to Rome by way of Austrian-ruled Lviv, where Metropolitan Andrey Sheptytsky of the Ukrainian Greek Catholic Church blessed his mission.

Conversion and ordination
On 31 July 1902, Feodorov was formally received into the Catholic Church at the Church of the Gesù in Rome. In the aftermath, he began studying at the Jesuit seminary at Anagni under the pseudonym of "Leonidas Pierre," which was meant to keep the Tsar's secret police, or Okhrana, off his trail.

Although Leonid had originally promised to adopt the Latin Rite, while studying in the Collegio Leoniano, a Jesuit major seminary at Anagni, Leonid came to believe that it was his duty to remain faithful to the liturgy and customs of the Christian East. With the full permission and encouragement of Pope Pius X, Leonid transferred to the Russian Byzantine Catholic Church. As a result of his decision, Leonid was disowned by his former Jesuit mentor and afterwards depended for his finances on Metropolitan Andrei Sheptytsky of Lviv.

On March 25, 1911, he received ordination as a Byzantine rite priest by Metropolitan Michael Mirov of the Bulgarian Greek Catholic Church in Constantinople. He spent the following years as a Studite hieromonk in Bosnia and Ukraine and was tonsured with monastic name 'Leontiy' on 12 March 1913.

Return to Russia
On the eve of the First World War, he returned to Saint Petersburg whereupon he was immediately exiled to Tobolsk in Siberia as a potential threat to the Tsar's government which held Russian Orthodoxy as its state religion.

After the February Revolution, the Provisional Government ordered the release of all political prisoners. A three-day Synod of the Russian Byzantine Catholic Church opened in Saint Petersburg under the leadership of Metropolitan Andrey, who, at the end of the Synod, named Feodorov Exarch of the Russian Catholics. Once Fr. Cyril Korolevsky successfully proved to the Holy See that Metropolitan Andrey had simply made use of his rights as defined by Pope Pius X, Feodorov's position as Exarch was confirmed by Pope Benedict XV.

He served as abbot in the Church of the Descent of the Holy Spirit in Petrograd, under his leadership the women's order of the Holy Family, the Community of Sisters of the Holy Spirit, and the Society of John Chrysostom were founded. He made presentations, participated in disputes with Orthodox clergy.

The Cieplak Trial
Open persecution of religion began in 1922. The clergy were forbidden to preach religion to anyone under eighteen years of age. Then, all sacred objects were ordered to be seized for "famine relief" and lay councils called dvatsatkii were installed in each parish by the GPU with the intention of making the priest a mere employee. When both the Exarch Leonid and the Latin Rite Archbishop Jan Cieplak refused to permit this, all Catholic parishes were forcibly closed by the State.

In the spring of 1923, Exarch Leonid, Archbishop Cieplak, Monsignor Konstanty Budkiewicz, and fourteen other Catholic priests and one layman were summoned to Moscow trial before the revolutionary tribunal for counter-revolutionary activities.

According to Father Christopher L. Zugger,

The Bolsheviks had already orchestrated several 'show trials.' The Cheka had staged the 'Trial of the St. Petersburg Combat Organization'; its successor, the new GPU, the 'Trial of the Socialist Revolutionaries.' In these and other such farces, defendants were inevitably sentenced to death or to long prison terms in the north. The Cieplak show trial is a prime example of Bolshevik revolutionary justice at this time. Normal judicial procedures did not restrict revolutionary tribunals at all; in fact, the prosecutor N.V. Krylenko, stated that the courts could trample upon the rights of classes other than the proletariat. Appeals from the courts went not to a higher court, but to political committees. Western observers found the setting -- the grand ballroom of a former Noblemen's Club, with painted cherubs on the ceiling -- singularly inappropriate for such a solemn event. Neither judges nor prosecutors were required to have a legal background, only a proper 'revolutionary' one. That the prominent 'No Smoking' signs were ignored by the judges themselves did not bode well for legalities."

New York Herald correspondent Francis McCullagh, who was present at the trial, later described its fourth day as follows:

Unlike the other defendants, Exarch Leonid insisted on acting as his own attorney, which led to some of the most dramatic moments of the trial. According to Father Zugger,

Dressed in the traditional Russian black cassock, with his long hair a beard often described as 'Christ-like', Feodorov was a man of the narod, of the ordinary Russian people for whom the Revolution had been fought. His presence put the lie to the usual description of Catholicism as 'the Polish religion.' His presentation -- a moving testimony of Russian spirituality and the history of the Church in that country -- evoked the best of Russian Christendom. He pointed out that Greek-Catholics greeted the Revolution with joy, for only then did they have equality. There was no secret organization, they had simply followed Church law. Religious education, the celebration of Mass, and the administration of the Sacraments of marriage and baptism had to be fulfilled. He pointed out that the Church, accused of having neglected the starving, was at that moment feeding 120,000 children daily. Following a scathing rebuttal by Krylenko, Exarch Feodorov rose for his final remarks: "Our hearts are full, not of hatred, but of sadness. You cannot understand us, we are not allowed liberty of conscience. That is the only conclusion we can draw from what we have heard here."

With the verdict and sentences already decided upon in advance, Archbishop Cieplak and Monsignor Budkiewicz were both sentenced to death. Exarch Leonid and all the other defendants were sentenced to the term of ten years imprisonment.

The Gulag
The international uproar which followed the trial gave the Soviet government pause, however. In 1926, after serving the first three years of his sentence in Moscow's Butyrka prison, Exarch Leonid was transported to Solovki prison camp, located in a former island monastery in the White Sea.

He was a pioneer of ecumenism together with the Orthodox with whom he shared the harsh captivity. In Solovki, the Tridentine Mass was offered in a chapel which had been restored for the purpose with the permission of the guards. Exarch Leonid would offer the Divine Liturgy of the Russian Byzantine Catholic Church every other Sunday. When the camp authorities cracked down on this in 1929, the Masses and Divine Liturgies continued in secret.

Release and death
On 6 August 1929, Exarch Leonid was released to the town of Pinega in the Arkhangelsk Oblast and put to work making charcoal. After continuing to teach the Catechism to young boys, he was transferred to the village of Poltava, 15 km from Kotlas (not to be confused with the city of Poltava, Ukraine), where he completed his sentence in 1932. He chose to reside in Kirov, Kirov Oblast,  where, worn out by the rigours of his imprisonment, he died on 7 March 1935.

Legacy
On 27 June 2001, Exarch Leonid Feodorov was beatified by Pope John Paul II. He remains deeply venerated among Russian Catholics.

Metropolitan Andrey Sheptytsky of the Ukrainian Greek Catholic Church said, "We expect that the exarch [Leonid Feodoriv] is on the road to glorification through beatification. Of course, it is much too early to talk about this, but all of us were strongly impressed by his holiness, strengthened by the crown of martyrdom and death; this certainly supports our expectations. On the other hand, as a Russian Catholic, as exarch, as someone who died at the hands of the Bolsheviks, it seems to us that he will be right in the center of attention of the entire Church."

See also

References

External links
Biography
Life of Blessed Leonid Feodorov
An "Insight" episode based on Leonid Feodorov, portrayed by Steve Forrest

1879 births
1935 deaths
20th-century Roman Catholic martyrs
Beatifications by Pope John Paul II
Converts to Eastern Catholicism from Eastern Orthodoxy
Eastern Catholic beatified people
Eastern Catholic monks
Eastern Catholics from the Russian Empire
Eastern Catholic writers
Former Russian Orthodox Christians
Inmates of Solovki prison camp
Clergy from Saint Petersburg
Prisoners and detainees of the Soviet Union
Russian beatified people
Russian Eastern Catholics
Russian exiles in the Russian Empire
Russian Greek-Catholics
Russian people of Greek descent
Soviet show trials
Studite Brethren